Anjali Marathe is an Indian playback singer and Hindustani vocalist.

Early life
She learned classical music from her mother Anuradha Marathe who is herself a renowned classical and light vocalist and conducts stage shows of Marathi as well as Hindi songs.

Career
Anjali, a psychology graduate wanted to pursue medicine, but in Std XI she realised that her calling was music. She won the National Film Award for Best Playback Singer in 1996 at the age of 16 for her rendition of a song in the Marathi film Doghi. She recorded songs for Chaukat Raja (Marathi), Saibaba (Marathi), before Doghi (Marathi) and title songs for the serial - Jhuthe Sacche Gudde Bacche (Hindi), Olak Sangana (Marathi) at a young age of nine. She also recorded songs for All India Radio Pune for Balodyan (Programme for children). She has participated in many stage shows. She participated in Smaranayatra held at Jagtik Marathi Parishad in Mumbai. She participated in a programme for children, Chimangani. Anjali, besides these shows, also participates in elocution, dance, drama and street plays.

Personal life
Anjali is the daughter of singer Anuradha Marathe. She was married to Saleel Kulkarni. They have two children – son Shubhankar who sang for kids' movie 'Chintoo' (चिंटू), and daughter Ananya. They recently got separated.

References

Living people
Indian women playback singers
20th-century Indian singers
Marathi people
Marathi playback singers
Bollywood playback singers
Marathi-language singers
Hindustani singers
Indian women classical singers
Year of birth missing (living people)
Women Hindustani musicians
20th-century Indian women singers
21st-century Indian women singers
21st-century Indian singers
Best Female Playback Singer National Film Award winners